King Khalid Wildlife Research Center (KKWRC), also known as the Thumamah Research Centre, and formerly as al-Thumamah Farm, is a biological research facility and a wildlife observatory located at the King Khalid Royal Reserve (formerly al-Thumamah Wildlife Park) in the al-Thumamah area of northeastern Riyadh, Saudi Arabia. It was established for the preservation and captive breeding of the country's endangered wildlife in 1987 during the reign of King Fahd and was managed by the Zoological Society of London under the supervision of the Saudi Wildlife Authority (now the National Center of Wildlife) before the former completely handed over administrative duties to the latter in 2016.

Observatory duties and role 
The observatory's purpose is to oversee the preservation, propagation and resettlement of over 500 endangered animal species of Saudi Arabia, that include

 Rhim gazelle
 Mountain gazelle
 Erlanger's gazelle
 Nubian ibex
 Arabian oryx

References 

Wildlife rehabilitation and conservation centers
Nature reserves in Saudi Arabia
Protected areas of Saudi Arabia
1987 establishments in Saudi Arabia
Riyadh Province